Danbury High School (formerly Lakeside High School) is a public high school in Lakeside, Ohio. It is the only high school in the Danbury Local Schools district.  Their mascot is the Lakers. Danbury is noted to be a small successful high school due to its reduced class size of around 25-40 students per graduating class.

Athletics
The Danbury Lakers SBC.  As of the 2015–16 school year, Danbury sponsors the sports of baseball, basketball (boys & girls), cross country (boys & girls), football, golf (boys & girls), softball, track & field (boys & girls), volleyball, and wrestling.

References

External links
 District Website

High schools in Ottawa County, Ohio
Public high schools in Ohio